High-Dollar Gospel is the seventh album by Virginia-based blues rock artist, Eli Cook. It was released on August 18, 2017.

The album consists of mostly acoustic, original songs and revamped covers of Muddy Waters and Bob Dylan. At the time of release, Cook stated this album contained the most "authenticity" in his songwriting to date.

The ironic nature of the title was inspired by a spiritual "loss of direction" that Cook noticed in American youth.

Critical reception
Critical response has been highly positive. Scott Bampton of Rock & Blues Muse noted that Eli had marked a "new blues territory" with the album's release. Shane Handler of Glide Magazine stated that High-Dollar Gospel proves that "Eli can play with the best." Blues Festival Guide complimented the energy of the album, stating that the record "preaches a high voltage bolt to your ears and shakes you loose."

Personnel
Eli Cook – Vocals, Guitar, Mandolin
Peter Spaar – Upright Bass
Nathan Brown – Drums

Track listing
All songs written by Eli Cook, except where noted.

External links
Troublemaker live
The Devil Finds Work

References 

2017 albums
Blues rock albums by American artists